The Baltusrol Golf Club is a private 36-hole golf club in the eastern United States, located in Springfield, New Jersey, about  west of New York City. It was founded  in 1895 by Louis Keller.

In 1985, Baltusrol became the first club to have hosted both the U.S. Open and Women's U.S. Open on two different courses. Both courses were originally designed by A. W. Tillinghast in 1918. The club has been the site of seven U.S. Opens and two PGA Championships.

In 2005, the club was listed on the National Register of Historic Places.  In 2014, it was further designated a National Historic Landmark in recognition of its importance to Tillinghast's career as a course designer.

History
Baltusrol Golf Club was named after Baltus Roll (1769–1831), who farmed the land on which the club resides today. In 1831, he was murdered at age 61 on February 22 by two thieves who believed that he had hidden a small treasure in his farmhouse on Baltusrol mountain. Two men, Peter B. Davis and Lycidias Baldwin were suspected of the murder. Baldwin fled to a tavern in Morristown where he killed himself with an apparent overdose of narcotics. Davis was apprehended and stood trial in Newark. Despite the overwhelming but circumstantial evidence, much of which the trial judge ruled as inadmissible, Davis was acquitted of murder. He was, however, convicted of forgery and sentenced to 24 years in prison, and later died in Trenton State Prison.

The land was purchased in the 1890s by Louis Keller, who was the publisher of the New York Social Register. He owned  of land in Springfield Township. On October 19, 1895, Keller announced that the Baltusrol Golf Club would open. The club's original 9-hole course was designed by George Hunter in 1895 and expanded to 18 holes in 1898. This course, which is called the Old Course, was further modified by George Low and no longer exists.

Keller hired A. W. Tillinghast to build a second golf course to complement the Old Course. However, Tillinghast recommended that the Old Course be plowed over and he would design and build two new courses. The club approved his design recommendation and commenced construction of the Upper and Lower courses in 1918. In August 1919, Golf Illustrated declared that "what they are planning at Baltusrol is on a vaster scale than anything that has ever been attempted in American Golf for the opening of the Dual Courses." The Dual Courses, or Upper and Lower, were the first contiguous 36-hole design built in America. Both courses officially opened for play in June 1922. In the years following their opening, refinements were made to prepare these courses for National Championship play. The first national championship held on the Lower was the 1926 United States Amateur. The first national championship on the Upper was the U.S. Open in 1936. Tillinghast served as the club's architect until his death in 1942.

In 1948, Robert Trent Jones was retained to update and lengthen the Lower course for tournament play. The Lower course was lengthened again by his son Rees Jones in 1992 in preparation for the U.S. Open in 1993. He also updated and lengthened the Upper course in advance of the 2000 U.S. Amateur.  On both the Lower and Upper courses, Jones and his senior designer Steve Weisser reinstated and restored various Tillinghast design features which had been lost over the years.  Some famous golfers to win tournaments at Baltusrol include Ed Furgol, Mickey Wright, Jack Nicklaus, Lee Janzen, and Phil Mickelson. In 1995, Golf Magazine recognized Baltusrol as one of "The First 100 Clubs in America."

Clubhouse
In March 1909, the original clubhouse burned down. That same year, a new clubhouse was quickly designed by Chester Hugh Kirk, a member of the golf club, in a Tudor revival style and construction begun in June.

In 1912, it became the first clubhouse to host a President of the United States, William Howard Taft.

Tournaments hosted
In its history, Baltusrol has hosted 15 USGA-sponsored championships and two PGA Championships. It has hosted the U.S. Open seven times, in 1903, 1915, 1936, 1954, 1967, 1980, and 1993. It has hosted the U.S. Amateur four times, in 1904, 1926, 1946, and 2000. It has hosted the U.S. Women's Open twice, in 1961 and 1985, and the U.S. Women's Amateur twice, in 1901 and 1911. The 2005 PGA Championship was Baltusrol's first time hosting a PGA Championship, and it returned in 2016. The 79th Women's PGA Championship for 2023 and the 111th PGA Championship for 2029 were awarded to Baltusrol in a joint deal.

Source:
Bolded years are major championships on the PGA Tour

Course information
The Upper and Lower courses are very different, being built on two distinct geological formations. Tillinghast designed them as "Dual Courses" which were to be "equally sought after as a matter of preference."  The Lower is spread out over rolling parkland, the remains of a terminal moraine deposited during the last glaciation about 18,000 years ago. The Upper runs along a ridgeline known as Baltusrol Mountain, the east side of the First Watchung Mountain (Orange Mountain) that was formed from vast lava flows about 200 million years ago. Both courses have ponds and other man-made and natural hazards that come into play. On the Lower Course, the 4th hole and the 18th hole have ponds, and on the Upper Course, the 9th and the 13th holes have ponds.  The 10th, 13th, and 15th holes have creeks in play.  As of 2010, Baltusrol Golf Club holds the distinction of being the only two-course club to ever host both the U.S. Men's and Women's Open Championships on both of its courses.

Lower Course
The Lower course from the black tees measures  and is a par 72, but for the 2005 PGA Championship, the course measured  and was par 70. From the blue tees, the course measures  and is par 72. From the green tees, the course measures 6,652 yards and is par 72. From the white tees, the course measures  and is par 72. From the red tees, the course measures  and is par 73. In its listing of the "Top 100 Courses in the U.S.", GOLF Magazine selected the Lower Course as 22nd in 1995, 1997, and 1999.

The three signature holes of the Lower Course are the fourth, a par three of  where the player must hit his or her ball over the pond to a two-tiered green; the seventeenth, a par five of  where John Daly is the only player to ever reach the green in two strokes (later, Tiger Woods fired his second shot over the green in two shots at the 2005 PGA Championship); and the eighteenth, a par five of  famous for spectacular performances by Furgol, Nicklaus, Mickelson and Jason Day.

Upper Course
From the black tees the Upper course is a par 72, blue tees par 72, green tees par 72, white tees par 72, red tees par 73, gold tees par 73, . The Upper Course has hosted three of the club's national championship including the 1936 U.S. Open.  GOLF Magazine's "Top 100 Courses in the U.S." selected the Upper Course 89th in 1997 and 74th in 1999.

General information

The pro shop is open from 7:00 A.M. to 7:00 P.M. The course is not open to the public.  Guests are permitted to play with a member. The dress code states that denim is not allowed and that a collared shirt is required. Metal spiked shoes and fivesomes are not allowed. Moreover, cellphone use is not permitted on the course or on club grounds except in one's car. The course is open year-round. Players are required to use a caddy between the hours of 7 am and 2 pm. The fairways and greens are poa annua and bent grass. The greens are aerated in late March to early April, late August, and November after the season ends, and there is overseeding of Penn A4 Bentgrass. The rough is Kentucky Bluegrass.

Audubon certification
Audubon International has designated the Baltusrol Golf Club a Certified Audubon Cooperative Sanctuary. First bestowed to Baltusrol in 1999, Audubon International recognizes that Baltusrol manages its lands with concern to the environment. Audubon International uses criteria of environmental planning, wildlife and habitat management, chemical usage reduction and safety, water conservation, and water quality management.

See also

List of National Historic Landmarks in New Jersey
National Register of Historic Places listings in Union County, New Jersey

References

External links

Official 2016 PGA Championship website
Official 2005 PGA Championship website
The Upper Course at GolfCourse.com
The Lower Course at GolfCourse.com

1895 establishments in New Jersey
Buildings and structures in Union County, New Jersey
Golf clubs and courses designed by A. W. Tillinghast
Golf clubs and courses in New Jersey
Golf clubs and courses on the National Register of Historic Places
Historic districts on the National Register of Historic Places in New Jersey
National Historic Landmarks in New Jersey
National Register of Historic Places in Union County, New Jersey
New Jersey Register of Historic Places
Springfield Township, Union County, New Jersey
Sports venues on the National Register of Historic Places in New Jersey
Tourist attractions in Union County, New Jersey
U.S. Open (golf) venues